Garker is a hamlet situated  north-east of St Austell in Cornwall, England.  Garker lies close to the western edge of the Eden Project visitor attraction.  Garker is in the civil parish of Carlyon.

References

Hamlets in Cornwall